There were two Copa del Rey Finals played in 1913:

1913 Copa del Rey Final (UECF), Barcelona 4–3 (aggregate) Real Sociedad
1913 Copa del Rey Final (FEF), Racing de Irún 3–2 (aggregate) Athletic Bilbao